Lynley is a given name. Notable people with the name include:

Carol Lynley (1942–2019), American actress and former child model
Dahlia Lynley-Chivers, fictional character from The Southern Vampire Mysteries/Sookie Stackhouse Series by  Charlaine Harris
Lynley Dodd, DNZM (born 1941), author of children's books from New Zealand
Lynley Hannen (born 1964), former New Zealand rower, Olympic Bronze medallist
Lynley Pedruco (née Lucas) (born 1960), former New Zealand association football player
Margo Lynley, character in the soap opera The Bold and the Beautiful

In fiction
Thomas Lynley

See also
Lynley Ridge, Alberta
The Inspector Lynley Mysteries, series of BBC television programmes
Linley (disambiguation)